Joseph Dumont (April 19, 1847 – January 15, 1912) was a merchant and political figure in Quebec. He represented Kamouraska in the Legislative Assembly of Quebec from 1877 to 1878 and Kamouraska in the House of Commons of Canada from 1878 to 1882 as a Liberal member.

Biography
He was born in Saint-André, Quebec, the son of Lifsey Dumont and Émilie Saint-Pierre, and was educated at Sainte-Anne-de-la-Pocatière. In 1869, he was named a papal zouave at Rome. Dumont was a merchant at Kamouraska. He was elected to the provincial assembly in 1877 after Charles-François Roy was elected to the House of Commons; his election was overturned in March of the following year. Dumont was married twice: to Cléophile Paradis in 1874 and to Marie-Eugénie Gagnon in 1889. He lived in the United States from 1882 to 1887. On his return, he became archivist for the Secretariat of Quebec, serving until 1909, when he was named deputy secretary for the province. In the same year, he was named a knight in the Order of St. Gregory the Great. Dumont died in Quebec City at the age of 64.

References

External links

1847 births
1912 deaths
Quebec Liberal Party MNAs
Members of the House of Commons of Canada from Quebec
Liberal Party of Canada MPs